Myron Rush (January 1, 1922 – January 8, 2018) was an American academic. He was a professor of government at Cornell University, and "one of [the] world’s foremost Kremlinologists."

Rush obtained his bachelor's degree from the University of Chicago after attending Woodrow Wilson Junior College and served in the United States Army Air Forces during World War II, then returned to Chicago for his doctorate. Subsequently, Rush worked for the Central Intelligence Agency and the RAND Corporation before joining the Cornell University faculty in 1965. Rush retired in 1992.

Rush was noted for discovering that Nikita Khrushchev was making a push to be General Secretary of the Communist Party of the Soviet Union, following Joseph Stalin's death in 1953.

References

1922 births
2018 deaths
Cornell University faculty
People from Hyde Park, New York
People of the Central Intelligence Agency
RAND Corporation people
United States Army Air Forces personnel of World War II
University of Chicago alumni